Buck is an unincorporated community in East Drumore Township in Lancaster County, Pennsylvania, United States. Pennsylvania Route 272 passes through the community.

It is the location of the Buck Motorsports Park, a local attraction.

References

External links

Unincorporated communities in Lancaster County, Pennsylvania
Unincorporated communities in Pennsylvania